Apeleptera is a genus of moths belonging to the subfamily Olethreutinae of the family Tortricidae.

It has a single species, Apeleptera semnodryas, found in Taiwan by Edward Meyrick in 1926.

See also
List of Tortricidae genera

References

Tortricidae genera
Monotypic moth genera
Moths of Taiwan
Olethreutinae